Shubham Kumar Singh (born December 1998) is Indian Cricketer who plays as a bowler for Jharkhand. He made his Twenty20 debut on 6 November 2021, for Jharkhand in the 2021–22 Syed Mushtaq Ali Trophy.

References 

1998 births
Living people
Indian cricketers
Jharkhand cricketers